Characters in the Wheel of Time series may refer to:

Major Wheel of Time characters
Minor Wheel of Time characters